Tell Abyad District is a district of the Raqqa Governorate in northern Syria. The administrative centre is the city of Tell Abyad. Parts of the district are currently under the Turkish occupation of northern Syria.

Demographics 
At the 2004 census, the district had a population of 129,714. The majority of inhabitants are Arabs, with considerable Kurdish and Turkmen minorities. All three groups are overwhelmingly Sunni. The western part of the district is mainly inhabited by Kurds, the Turkmens are mainly concentrated in Suluk and southwest of the town and the rest of the district is almost all Arab.

Subdistricts
The district of Tell Abyad is divided into three subdistricts or nawāḥī (population as of 2004):
Tell Abyad Subdistrict (ناحية تل أبيض): population 44,671.
Suluk Subdistrict (ناحية سلوك): population 44,131
Ayn Issa Subdistrict (ناحية عين عيسى): population 40,912.

Archaeology 
In the valley of the Balikh River, there exists an archaeological site called Tell Sabi Abyad.

References

 
Districts of Raqqa Governorate